Saint Louis, Saint-Louis or St. Louis commonly refers to:
 Louis IX of France, King of France from 1226 to 1270
 St. Louis, a city in Missouri, United States

It may also refer to:

Places

Canada 
 Saint-Louis, Quebec, a municipality
 Saint-Louis-de-Blandford, Quebec,  a small town northeast of Montreal
 Saint-Louis-de-France, Quebec,  a former town merged into Trois-Rivières in 2002
 Saint-Louis-de-Gonzague, Chaudière-Appalaches, Quebec, a municipality in the Les Etchemins Regional County Municipality
 Saint-Louis-de-Gonzague, Montérégie, Quebec, a parish municipality in the Beauharnois-Salaberry Regional County Municipality
 Saint-Louis-de-Gonzague-du-Cap-Tourmente, a parish municipality in Quebec
 Saint-Louis-du-Ha! Ha!, a parish municipality in the Témiscouata Regional County Municipality in Quebec
 Lake Saint-Louis, a lake in southwestern Quebec
 Saint-Louis (provincial electoral district), a former electoral district in Montreal, Quebec
 Saint-Louis-de-Kent, New Brunswick, a village
 Saint-Louis Parish, New Brunswick
 St. Louis, Prince Edward Island, an unincorporated community
 Rural Municipality of St. Louis No. 431, Saskatchewan
 St. Louis, Saskatchewan, a village

France 
 Saint-Louis, Haut-Rhin, a commune in the Haut-Rhin département at the German and Swiss border
 Saint-Louis, Moselle, a commune in the Moselle département
 Saint-Louis, Guadeloupe, a commune in the overseas department of Guadeloupe
 Saint-Louis, New Caledonia, a settlement in the overseas collectivity of New Caledonia
 Saint-Louis, Réunion, commune in the overseas department of Réunion
 Île Saint-Louis, an island on the Seine in Paris
 Saint-Louis-de-Montferrand, Gironde
 Saint-Louis-en-l'Isle, Dordogne
 Saint-Louis-et-Parahou, Aude
 Saint-Louis-lès-Bitche, Moselle

Haiti 
 Saint-Louis-du-Sud, a commune in the Sud department of Haiti
 Saint-Louis-du-Nord, a commune in the Nord department of Haiti

Seychelles 
 Saint Louis, Seychelles, an administrative district on the island of Mahé

Senegal 
 Saint-Louis, Senegal, capital city of the Saint-Louis Region
 Saint-Louis Region, a region on the border with Mauritania

Thailand 
 Saint Louis BTS station, a rapid transit station in Bangrak and Sathon, Bangkok
 Saint Louis Hospital, a private Catholic hospital in Sathon, Bangkok

United States 
 Bay St. Louis, Mississippi, city in Hancock County
 Old Saint Louis, Indiana, unincorporated community
 San Luis Obispo, California (Spanish for "St. Louis, Bishop"), a city in California
 San Luis Obispo County, California, a county in California
 St. Louis, Missouri, independent city
 St. Louis County, Missouri, bordering the city of St. Louis
 Lake St. Louis, Missouri, planned community in St. Charles County
 St. Louis, Michigan, city in Gratiot County
 St. Louis County, Minnesota
 St. Louis Park, Minnesota, city in Hennepin County
 Saint Louis River, river in Minnesota and Wisconsin
 Saint Louis Creek, a stream in Colorado
 St. Louis, Oklahoma, town in Pottawatomie County
 Saint Louis, Oregon, unincorporated community
 Saint Louis, Virginia, unincorporated community

People 
 Louis IX of France (1214–1270), a King of France and Catholic saint
 Louis of Toulouse (1274–1297), bishop of Toulouse and Roman Catholic saint
 Louis de Montfort (1673–1716), French priest and Roman Catholic saint
 Brad St. Louis (born 1976), American football player
 Fabienne St Louis (born 1988), Mauritian / French triathlete
 Louis St. Louis, American songwriter
 Martin St. Louis (born 1975), Canadian ice hockey player
 Tyree St. Louis (born 1997), American football player

Ships 
 Saint Louis (1752 ship), a French East Indiaman
 , a French Navy battleship in commission from 1900 to 1919
 Saint Louis (hotel barge), a hotel barge in southwest France
 Saint-Louis-class cruiser, a class of planned French heavy cruiser, never built
 MS St. Louis, a German ocean liner, notable for a voyage in 1939 when it carried 908 Jewish refugees from Germany
 USS St. Louis, seven United States Navy ships

Sports
 St Louis (horse), a racehorse
 Arizona Cardinals, a professional NFL team known as the St. Louis Cardinals from 1960 to 1987
 See History of the St. Louis Cardinals (NFL) for more details on the team's tenure in St. Louis
 Los Angeles Rams, a professional NFL team known as the St. Louis Rams from 1995 to 2015
 See History of the St. Louis Rams for more details on the team's tenure in St. Louis
 St. Louis All-Stars, a professional football team during the 1923 NFL season
 Saint Louis Billikens, the intercollegiate athletic program of Saint Louis University
 St. Louis Blues, a professional ice hockey team in the National Hockey League
 St. Louis Browns, a professional baseball team that became the Baltimore Orioles in 1954
 St. Louis Cardinals, a professional baseball team in Major League Baseball
 St. Louis Gunners, a 1934 member of the National Football League that joined the minor AFL in 1939
 St. Louis Stampede, members of the Arena Football League 1995–1996

Soccer teams
 Saint Louis FC, American men's team
 AC St. Louis, American men's team
 FC St. Louis, American women's team
 Saint Louis Athletica, American women's team
 SS Saint-Louisienne, Réunion team
 Saint Louis Suns United FC, Seychelles team

Colleges and universities 
 Lycée Saint-Louis, in Paris, France
 Saint Louis University (SLU), St. Louis, Missouri
 Saint-Louis University, Brussels (UCLouvain), Brussels, Belgium
 Saint Louis University (Philippines), a private teaching university in Baguio
 St. Louis Christian College, Florissant, Missouri
 University of Saint Louis Tuguegarao, Tuguegarao City, Philippines
 Gaston Berger University, Senegal, formerly known as University of Saint-Louis

Other uses 
 Fort St. Louis (disambiguation)
 St. Louis (beer), a Belgian-style beer by Brouwerij Van Honsebrouck
 St. Louis cuisine, the food of the region, including its own style of pizza, barbecue, cake, and ravioli
 St. Louis Car Company, a manufacturer of streetcars, trolleybuses and locomotives
 St. Louis Cathedral (disambiguation)
 St. Louis Hotel, in 19th-century New Orleans, Louisiana
 St. Louis Plantation, in Iberville Parish, Louisiana
 Saint Louis (El Greco), a c. 1592–1595 painting
 Saint-Louis (glass manufacturer), a French glass manufacturer
 Order of Saint Louis, a military Order of Chivalry

See also
 San Luis (disambiguation), the Spanish language cognate of the name
 San Luis Obispo, California, a city in the U.S. state of California
 São Luís (disambiguation), the Portuguese language cognate of the name
 The Spirit of St. Louis (disambiguation)